The Hits is a greatest hits compilation album by British singer-songwriter Will Young. It was released on 16 November 2009. It contains twelve songs from Young's first four studio albums, From Now On (2002), Friday's Child (2003), Keep On (2005) and Let It Go (2008), plus two bonus tracks. The first is new single "Hopes & Fears", and the second is a ballad called "If It Hadn't Been for Love".

The album is noted for omitting certain single releases: "Anything Is Possible", which was a number-one hit as a double A-side with "Evergreen", the number-one duet with Gareth Gates, "The Long and Winding Road" and the single "Don't Let Me Down". Four tracks were written or co-written by Will Young.

Track listing

Notes
The album was released as a deluxe edition, which included a DVD of the music videos for the songs featured on the album.

Charts

Weekly charts

Year-end charts

Certifications

Release history

References

2009 greatest hits albums
Will Young albums
19 Recordings compilation albums
Albums produced by Richard Stannard (songwriter)
Albums produced by Mike Peden